Sayyed Sharif al-Din Ali Shirazi was a Persian cleric, who served as sadr  in Safavid Iran during 1508–1510 and later from 1512 until his death in the battle of Chaldiran in 1514. He was a grandchild of Sharif Jurjani, and was the father of the prominent bureaucrat and grand vizier, Mir Sharif Shirazi.

Sources 
 
 

People from Shiraz
16th-century people of Safavid Iran
1514 deaths
15th-century births